Mircea Grabovschi (sometimes spelled Grabovski or Grabowski; 22 December 1952 – 2002) was a Romanian handball player and coach. He won the world title in 1974 and a silver medal at the 1976 Olympics. During his career he played 199 matches for the national team and scored 544 goals.

After retiring from competitions he became a coach, managing among others HC Argeș. He was an avid bridge player.

Honors and awards 
 Honored Master of Sport ("Maestru emerit al sportului"), 1976
 Cetățean de onoare ("Honorary Citizen") of his hometown, Sighișoara, 2009.

References

External links
 databaseOlympics profile
 World Bridge Federation profile

1952 births
2002 deaths
Romanian male handball players
CS Dinamo București (men's handball) players
Handball players at the 1976 Summer Olympics
Olympic handball players of Romania
Olympic silver medalists for Romania
Olympic medalists in handball
People from Sighișoara
Medalists at the 1976 Summer Olympics